Yuta Nakano may refer to:

Yuta Nakano (musician) (中野雄太), Japanese music composer and arranger
Yuta Nakano (footballer) (中野裕太, born 1989), Japanese football player